Theo Bevacqua (born 13 September 2001) is a Welsh rugby union player, currently playing for Pro14 side Cardiff Rugby. His preferred position is prop.

Cardiff Rugby
Bevacqua signed for the Cardiff academy for the 2020–21 season. He made his Cardiff debut in Round 13 of the 2020–21 Pro14 against Munster.

References

External links
itsrugby.co.uk Profile

2001 births
Living people
Welsh rugby union players
Cardiff Rugby players
Rugby union props